Unidisc Music is a Canadian independent record label. The label is known for releasing rare music, that was made between the mid-1960s and late 1980s. Genres include rock, electronic, funk, soul, hip hop, jazz, reggae, Latin, disco and a cappella. Unidisc owns the 1982–1993 Sutra Records catalog, and the catalogs of other independent New York labels that the latter distributed.

History 
Founder George Cucuzzella began his career as a nightclub DJ, in Montreal, in the 1970s. He formed a Canadian Record Pool, supplying his mixes to other DJ's across Quebec, and producing remixes. Examples are: Lady Bump by Penny MacLean, Don't Stop the Music by the Bay City Rollers, and Love to Love by Tina Charles. Through Downstairs Records, he became a dance music importer and exporter, and indie-store supplier. He started Unidisc Music, which began in 1977.

Unidisc acquired the recording and publishing rights of Prelude Records in New York, which included Musique's 1978 dance floor hit In the Bush. Additional tracks are by Saturday Night Band, Inner life, D Train and Unlimited Touch.

Unidisc purchased rights to Ahed Music, De-Lite Records, Emergency Records, Megatone Records, Midland International Records, Network Records, Pickwick Records, Quality Records and SOLAR Records – as well as the Canadian labels Daffodil, MWC and Attic Records.

The label began collaborating with Kanye West, Missy Elliott, Snoop Dogg, Limp Bizkit, LL Cool J, Notorious B.I.G., Coolio, Dr. Dre, Faith Evans, Lil' Jon and Chris Brown. In 2008, Unidisc bought Aquarius and Tacca Musique. In 2010, the label merged with DEP Records and Universal Music Canada. Unidisc began Kookoo Records for house and electronic music, releasing music from Boston Bun, Pat Lok and Martin Alix.

Function 
Unidisc's main acquisition of revenue has been by selling synch rights to the songs it owns. When the rights are purchased from its catalog, the songs are incorporated into mainstream entertainment media via movies, television, animation, commercials and video games. These include Fresh Prince of Bel Air, Sex and the City, Grey's Anatomy, Bones, CSI: Miami, Dancing with the Stars, Flashdance, Fame, Studio 54, Summer of Sam, Bad Santa, Joe Dirt, Rio, Open Season, G Force, Dreyers Ice Cream, Gap, Diet Pepsi, Miller Coors and Grand Theft Auto.

Unidisc's publishing functions operate under Unitunes (ASCAP), Lovetown Music (BMI), Socan-affiliated Blue Image, Keep on Music, Star Quality Music and Prime Quality Music.

Unidisc markets through YouTube, iTunes, Facebook, MySpace and Twitter. In the 1980s, Unidisc worked with Lime, Erotic Drum Band, Gino Soccio, Nightlife Unlimited, Trans X, Freddie James and Geraldine Hunt. In the 1990s, the label acquired publishing rights to Celine Dion, David Bowie, April Wine, Patrick Norman, Robert Charlebois, Babyface, T.L.C., Boyz II Men, Toni Braxton, Usher and Corey Hart.

Select roster 
 
 April Wine
 A Foot in Coldwater
 Anvil
 D. Train
 Dynasty
 Haywire
 The Hunt
 Irene Cara
 Lee Aaron
 Lime
 Moxy
 Razor
 Ronnie Hawkins
 Wednesday
 Salsoul Orchestra
 Shalamar
 Skydiggers
 The Nylons
 The Stampeders
 The Whispers
 Fat Larry's Band
 Xavion

Sublabels 
 Black Sun Records
 Illusion Records
 Image Records
 Karisma Records
 Matra Records
 SOLAR Records
 De-Lite Records
 Emergency Records
 Sutra Records
 Becket Records
 Sound of New York Records
 Megatone Records
 Prism Records
 Butterfly Records
 Radar Records
 Les Disques Star Records
 Sugarscoop Records
 Aquarius Records
 Attic Records
 Beyond Music
 Prelude Records
 Mirage Records

See also 

List of record labels

References

External links 
 Official Site

Canadian independent record labels
Companies based in Pointe-Claire
Record labels established in 1977
Rock record labels
Electronic music record labels
Soul music record labels
Hip hop record labels
Reggae record labels
Latin American music record labels
Quebec record labels